Jim Rome Is Burning (originally titled Rome Is Burning and often abbreviated as JRIB) is a sports conversation and opinion show hosted by Jim Rome. Debuting on May 6, 2003, as Rome Is Burning, it was originally a weekly show in primetime at 7:00 PM ET on Tuesday nights on ESPN. After a short hiatus in 2004, it returned with a new name, Jim Rome Is Burning, and a late-night Thursday timeslot. In February 2005, JRIB became a daily program airing each afternoon at 4:30 PM in between NFL Live and Around the Horn. After ESPN expanded NFL Live to sixty minutes, JRIB moved to ESPN2 as part of its new afternoon lineup on September 12, 2011. It was produced by Mandt Bros. Productions in association with ESPN Original Entertainment and taped in Los Angeles as opposed to ESPN's Bristol, Connecticut headquarters. This was due to his daily radio commitment.

The show ended on January 27, 2012, with the announcement that Rome had agreed to a contract with CBS, CBS Sports Network, and Showtime. Outside of some 4:3 non-essential game footage camera angles used in play analysis during NFL Matchup, Rome is Burning was the final program in the ESPN family of networks outside ESPN Classic to be produced in standard definition and never upgraded to high definition.

Segments
 Rome Is Burning: Rome gave takes on four or five of the top sports-related stories of the day and always opened with the statement "Here's what I am burning on."
 Alone with Rome: Interview segment with current and former athletes, coaches, sports writers/columnists, and celebrities.
 The Forum: Rome was joined by a reporter, sports figure, or entertainer, usually for an entire week, to discuss various sports topics. Until 2011 there were usually two panelists joining Rome for The Forum.
 Correspondents: Generally, a player gave a tour of one of their team's sports facilities or took Rome and the TV audience through a normal day in the life of a sports athlete. The correspondents included David Wright, Nick Swisher, Ty Lawson, Tony Gonzalez, Delonte West and Donté Stallworth. For special occasions such as the NFL Draft, there was a group of correspondents.  The players who appeared as correspondents were said to attain good "JRIB karma" afterwards.
 Final Burn: The last segment of the show, in which Rome gave one or two final takes. He then thanked the show's guests and signed off with "I will see you next time. I am out."

These segments almost always ran in the above order, with Correspondents pieces about once per week.  On rare occasions, if the Forum guest was late to the studio or the remote location, that segment would air after the Forum.  On other occasions, the segments were in a different order by design. A show might end with a Correspondents piece instead of a Final Burn.

 U Smack 2 (formerly known as Smack Back): Rome responded to phone calls and e-mails. Discontinued in late 2005.

See also
 Jim Rome
 The Jim Rome Show

External links
 ESPN: Jim Rome is Burning
 Jim Rome official website
 ESPN.tv official site

2003 American television series debuts
2012 American television series endings
ESPN original programming
ESPN2 original programming
American sports television series
English-language television shows